Leptobrachella palmata is a species of frog in the family Megophryidae. It is endemic to Borneo, and only known from its type locality in Lipaso Forest Reserve, Sabah, Malaysia. Common names palm Borneo frog and palm dwarf litter frog have been coined for it.

Description
Based on the type series consisting of five adult males, Leptobrachella palmata measure  in snout–vent length. The overall appearance is moderately slender. The snout is obtusely pointed in dorsal view and rounded in profile. The tympanum is distinct. The finger and toe tips are expanded into small, triangular discs. The toes fully (between toes 1–2) webbed or nearly so. Skin is smooth. except for rounded glands on the sides and a distinct, curved supratympanic fold. Colour in alcohol is medium brown without markings above and white below.

Habitat and conservation

Leptobrachella palmata appears to be a rare species. While the type locality is a forest reserve, its management is not adequate for the purpose of biodiversity conservation. More in general, lowland forests like the one where the species was found are being rapidly logged, leading to habitat loss. Also the resulting siltation of the larval habitat is a threat.

References

palmata
Amphibians of Malaysia
Endemic fauna of Malaysia
Endemic fauna of Borneo
Taxa named by Robert F. Inger
Amphibians described in 1992
Taxonomy articles created by Polbot
Amphibians of Borneo